The 1948–49 BAA season was the Capitols' 3rd season in the NBA/BAA. They became the first team to win 15 straight games to start the season, an NBA record, which was since tied 45 years later by the Houston Rockets in 1993 before Golden State Warriors surpassed it in 2015.

Draft

Roster

Regular season

Season standings

Record vs. opponents

Game log

Playoffs

East Division Semifinals 
(1) Washington Capitols vs. (4) Philadelphia Warriors: Capitols win series 2-0
Game 1 @ Washington: Washington 92, Philadelphia 70
Game 2 @ Philadelphia: Washington 80, Philadelphia 78

Last Playoff Meeting: This is the first meeting between the Capitols and Warriors.

East Division Finals 
(1) Washington Capitols vs. (2) New York Knicks: Capitols win series 2-1
Game 1 @ Washington: Washington 77, New York 71
Game 2 @ New York: New York 86, Washington 84 (OT)
Game 3 @ Washington: Washington 84, New York 76

Last Playoff Meeting: This is the first meeting between the Capitols and Knicks.

BAA Finals

(E1) Washington Capitols vs. (W2) Minneapolis Lakers: Lakers win series 4-2
Game 1 @ Minneapolis: Minneapolis 88, Washington 84
Game 2 @ Minneapolis: Minneapolis 76, Washington 62
Game 3 @ Washington: Minneapolis 94, Washington 74
Game 4 @ Washington: Washington 83, Minneapolis 71
Game 5 @ Washington: Washington 74, Minneapolis 65
Game 6 @ Minneapolis: Minneapolis 77, Washington 56

Last Playoff Meeting: This is the first meeting between the Capitols and Lakers.

Awards and records
Bob Feerick, All-NBA Second Team
Bones McKinney, All-NBA Second Team

References

Washington Capitols seasons
Washington
Washington
Washington